Kearton Coates (May 13, 1820 – April 16, 1893) was a member of the Wisconsin State Assembly.

Biography
Coates was born on May 13, 1820 in Gunnerside, England. He moved to Platteville, Wisconsin in 1842 and to Linden, Wisconsin in 1844. He and his wife had 15 children. Coates died on April 16, 1893 and is buried in Edmund, Wisconsin.

Career
Coates became a member of the Assembly in 1875. Previously, Coates was Chairman and Assesor of Linden and Register of Deeds and Superintendent of the Poor of Iowa County, Wisconsin. In 1873, he was an unsuccessful candidate for county judge. He was a Republican.

References

External links

People from Richmondshire (district)
English emigrants to the United States
19th-century English people
People from Platteville, Wisconsin
People from Linden, Wisconsin
Republican Party members of the Wisconsin State Assembly
1820 births
1893 deaths
Burials in Wisconsin
19th-century American politicians